Tourouvre au Perche is a commune in the department of Orne, northwestern France. The municipality was established on 1 January 2016 by merger of the former communes of Autheuil, Bivilliers, Bresolettes, Bubertré, Champs, Lignerolles, La Poterie-au-Perche, Prépotin, Randonnai and Tourouvre (the seat).

Wattway 
On 22 December 2016, the world's first solar-panel road - the Wattway on the RD5 road - was inaugurated. It was covered with 2,800 square meters of electricity-generating panels. The panels are covered with a resin containing fine sheets of silicon, making them tough enough to withstand all traffic. The project cost 5m Euros. On 22 July 2019 it was reported to be a colossal failure.

See also 
Communes of the Orne department

References 

Communes of Orne
Populated places established in 2016
2016 establishments in France
Perche